Beauty & Crime is the seventh studio album  by singer-songwriter Suzanne Vega. It is her first album of new material since 2001's Songs in Red and Gray and her first for Blue Note Records. It was released on July 17, 2007. Beauty & Crime won the Grammy Award for Best Engineered Album, Non-Classical, on February 11, 2008. It was dedicated to Tim Vega, Suzanne's younger half-brother who had died in 2002.

Development 
After lukewarm commercial success for her last two albums, Nine Objects of Desire (1996) and Songs in Red and Gray (2001) A&M Records ended their contract with Vega with the release of the more commercially successful hits package Retrospective in 2003.

Vega embarked on an extensive tour and performed songs from Beauty & Crime in their early forms, including "Unbound", "Edith Wharton's Figurines", and "New York Is a Woman".

The album was recorded in New York City from November 10–27, 2006, with additional recording in England in January 2007.

Track listing 
All songs written by Suzanne Vega.
 "Zephyr & I" – 3:10
 "Ludlow Street" – 3:16
 "New York Is a Woman" – 2:54
 "Pornographer's Dream" – 3:23
 "Frank & Ava" – 2:38
 "Edith Wharton's Figurines" – 2:23
 "Bound" – 4:43
 "Unbound" – 3:34
 "As You Are Now" – 2:20
 "Angel's Doorway" – 2:55
 "Anniversary" – 2:57
 "Obvious Question" (bonus track) – 1:50

Personnel 
 Suzanne Vega – acoustic guitar, vocals (all tracks)
 Gerry Leonard – electric guitar (1, 2, 5 to 11), acoustic guitar (4, 5, 10)
 Lee Ranaldo – electric guitar (1, 2, 10)
 Martin Slattery – piano (3, 4, 7, 10), flute (9), brass (3), reeds (3)
 Samuel Dixon – bass (2, 3, 6, 11) live bass (8)
 Tony Shanahan – bass (1, 5, 9, 10)
 Mike Visceglia – bass (4)
 Graham Hawthorne – drums (1, 3, 5, 6, 9 to 11), live drums (2, 7, 8)
 Jimmy Hogarth – percussion (1 to 5, 10, 11) electric guitar (1), acoustic guitar (11)
 Doug Yowell – drums (4, 6), percussion (4, 6)
 KT Tunstall – background vocals, vocal arrangements (1, 5)
 Ruby Froom – background vocals (2, 8)
 Beccy Byrne – background vocals (8)
 Emily Singer – background vocals (8)
 Anthony Genn – background vocals (11)
 Philip Sheppard – cello (1, 6, 7)
 Matthew Ward – violin (1, 7)
 London Studio Orchestra – strings (2, 4, 7, 9) led by Perry Montague–Mason
 Pete Davis – programming (2, 4, 7, 8, 10)

Production
 Jimmy Hogarth – producer
 Cameron Craig – engineer
 Emery Dobyns – engineer
 Tchad Blake – mixing engineer
 Bob Ludwig – mastering engineer

Notes
Vega wrote following comments on the album's songs:

 "Zephyr & I": a conversation between the graffiti artist Zephyr and myself, West End Avenue remembered
 "Ludlow Street": for my brother Tim who lived there, memories of parties and rehab
 "New York is a Woman": New York personified as a woman who has had a hard time but is still beautiful
 "Pornographer's Dream": what would he really desire?
 "Frank & Ava": a couple who gets along in bed but not out
 "Edith Wharton's Figurines": women past and present, how we suffer for beauty
 "Bound": a love song to my husband
 "Unbound": a spiritual song about a plant
 "As You Are Now": to my daughter, who is a natural treasure
 "Angel's Doorway": A cop is stationed at Ground Zero and his wife wants him to leave his clothes at the door. Also about troops returning home.
 "Anniversary": The anniversary week of 9/11 a year later in New York City
 "Obvious Question": about alcohol and the damage done (this track is only available on the Japanese import CD)

Charts

References

Suzanne Vega albums
2007 albums
Blue Note Records albums
Grammy Award for Best Engineered Album, Non-Classical